most is a terminal pager program on Unix, OpenVMS, MS-DOS, Windows and Unix-like systems used to view (but not change) the contents of a text file one screen at a time. Programs of this sort are called pagers. It is similar to more, but has the extended capability of allowing both forward and backward navigation through the file, and can scroll left and right. most also supports multiple windows.

Mats Akerberg, Henk D. Davids, Rex O. Livingston, and Mark Pizzolato contributed to early VMS versions of most. Mark Pizzolato worked on it to get it ready for DECUS. Robert Mills re-wrote the search routines to use regular expressions.

See also
 pg (Unix)
 more (command)
 less (Unix)

References

External links
The MOST pager Home Page
manpage for most

Terminal pagers